Helen Margaret Tippett  (23 March 1933 – 11 February 2004) was the first woman professor of architecture in Australasia. Her career in academia began in Melbourne, Victoria, Australia, in 1969, where she taught 'Design and Practice and Management'. She moved to New Zealand where she was Dean of Architecture at Victoria University from 1980 to 1983, and later moved into professional practice, co-founding The Architects Collaborative.

In 1989, Tippett became the first woman to be elected president of the New Zealand Institute of Architects.

Education and early career 

Tippet was born on 23 March 1933 and studied architecture at Melbourne University in the early 1950s where her peers' description of her work at this time reveals "a determination to solve problems of careful planning analysis and building production as part of the design process".

Recognition 
Tippett received the New Zealand Institute of Building medal in 1989, and was awarded a leadership Award by the Master Builders Federation in 1990. She was appointed an Officer of the Order of the British Empire, for services to architecture, in the 1994 Queen's Birthday Honours.

Personal life 
Tippett died on 11 February 2004. The same year, an archive of material collected and produced by Tippett was transferred to Victoria University.

Legacy 
The National Association of Women in Construction gives an annual award in her name, to a person or organisation who has "furthered the interests of women in the construction industry".

References 

 

1933 births
New Zealand women architects
20th-century New Zealand architects
2004 deaths
People from Melbourne
New Zealand Officers of the Order of the British Empire
Academic staff of the Victoria University of Wellington
University of Melbourne alumni